John Adamson may refer to:
John Adamson (antiquary) (1787–1855), English antiquary
John Adamson (Queensland politician) (1857–1922), member of the Parliament of Queensland
John Adamson (minister) (1742–1808), Moderator of the General Assembly of the Church of Scotland
John Adamson (New South Wales politician) (1910–1984), member of the New South Wales Legislative Assembly
John Adamson (physician) (1809–1870), Scottish doctor, physicist and museum curator
John Adamson (publisher) (born 1949), British publisher
John Adamson (university principal) (1576–1653), principal of the University of Edinburgh, 1623–1652